Paul Heckingbottom (born 17 July 1977) is an English football coach and former player who is currently manager of Championship side Sheffield United. Heckingbottom played as a defender for several English clubs, including Sunderland, Scarborough, Hartlepool United, Darlington, Norwich City, Bradford City, Sheffield Wednesday, Barnsley and Mansfield Town.

After retiring as a player, Heckingbottom trained as a coach. He obtained a position with Barnsley's development squad and, after a successful spell as caretaker manager in which the club won promotion and the EFL Trophy, he was appointed manager in 2016. In February 2018 he moved to Leeds United, but he was sacked during the 2018 close season after 16 games in charge. Heckingbottom then managed Scottish Premiership club Hibernian, but was sacked in November 2019. In March 2021, he was appointed interim manager of Sheffield United until the end of the season. After returning to the U23's, he was appointed manager 25 November 2021, once again, on a four-a-and-half year deal following the sacking of Slaviša Jokanović.

Career

Early career
Heckingbottom was born in Barnsley and grew up in nearby Royston. As a child, he was a season-ticket holder at the town's football club, along with his grandfather. He started his football career at Manchester United as a trainee, but joined Sunderland in 1995 after failing to gain a professional contract. He had loan spells at Scarborough, Hartlepool United and Darlington, without featuring for Sunderland, before joining Darlington permanently in 1999. He made 126 appearances, scoring 6 goals, before catching the attention of First Division side Norwich City, who signed him in 2002 on a three-year contract.

Heckingbottom made just 16 appearances for Norwich, including only 7 starts, resulting in him cancelling his contract with the club by mutual consent after one year. He subsequently signed for Bradford City in July 2003, and was named their Player of the Year at the end of his first season. Bradford, however, were relegated to League One at the end of the 2003–04 season, and Heckingbottom left to join League One club Sheffield Wednesday during the close season.

Sheffield Wednesday
Heckingbottom was well favoured under both Wednesday managers Chris Turner and Paul Sturrock, making a total of 41 appearances at left back in his first season – more than any other player that year. He also scored four goals, helping the Owls to promotion to the Championship via the play-off final at the end of the 2004–05 season. Due to an injury sustained in pre-season he was put out of contention for the first 16 games of the 2005–06 season. When he returned to fitness, new signing John Hills had begun to make the left back spot his own. An injury to Hills left Heckingbottom able to re-stake his claim on the team, but he only managed a 4-game streak before once again succumbing to injury, this time Peter Gilbert taking his place in the squad. Sturrock allowed Heckingbottom a chance to prove himself in an FA Cup Third Round game against Charlton Athletic. He scored both of Wednesday's goals in the 4–2 defeat at Hillsborough, though this was not enough to establish himself as the club's first-choice left back.

Barnsley
On 13 January 2006, Heckingbottom was sent on loan, with a view to a permanent move, to his boyhood club Barnsley. He played an important part in the club's promotion campaign and win over Swansea City in the League One play-off final, scoring in the 4–3 penalty shootout victory that secured their promotion to the Championship. Heckingbottom played in 31 games for Barnsley the next season, as they comfortably avoided relegation. He scored once during his spell at Barnsley, in a 1–0 win over Tranmere Rovers on 18 February 2006.

Bradford City
In July 2007, Heckingbottom returned to Bradford City on loan until 1 January 2008. He played in all 23 league games during his loan spell, missing only an FA Cup tie against Tranmere Rovers through suspension following a red card in a 1–1 draw with Stockport County. A week after his loan deal expired, his contract at Barnsley was cancelled by mutual consent and he signed a permanent 18-month deal at Bradford City. He missed his first league game of the 2007–08 season with four games left, when an ankle injury prevented him from playing against Brentford on 12 April 2008. Heckingbottom's place was taken by Luke O'Brien, who made his Bradford debut in a 2–2 draw.

He played in the club's first nine league games of the 2008–09 season, but was sent off in a 1–1 draw with Luton Town for two bookable offences. His place was again taken by youngster O'Brien, and although Heckingbottom returned for an FA Cup game against Milton Keynes Dons, he suffered tendonitis which kept him out for five months. Bradford opted against offering Heckingbottom a contract extension, and he left the club in May 2009.

Non-league career
Heckingbottom signed for Conference National club Mansfield Town on 2 June 2009, marking his first foray into the game outside the Football League. He sustained a hamstring injury in pre-season and did not play until October, in a 1–0 win over Forest Green Rovers, 11 months from when he last played a game of football. He became a regular in the Mansfield line-up. He scored his first and only Mansfield goal against Crawley Town on 14 November 2009. On 1 February 2010, Heckingbottom joined Gateshead on loan until the end of the season. making his debut on 13 February away at Hayes & Yeading United.

Heckingbottom signed for Gateshead on a permanent basis on 26 May 2010. He made 23 appearances in all competitions during the 2010–11 season before he was released on 4 May 2011.

He spent the 2011–12 season with Harrogate Town, making 21 appearances in the Conference North without scoring.

Coaching career

Barnsley
Heckingbottom took the opportunity to gain an academic understanding of football coaching, to set his CV apart from other managers competing for jobs. He completed his BSc (Hons) Sports Coaching at Leeds Metropolitan University in 2013, followed by an MSc in Sport Coaching in 2016, by which point the university had been renamed Leeds Beckett University.

He went on to work as a coach with professional club Barnsley's development squad, and was appointed caretaker manager of the first team after Danny Wilson was sacked in 2015. He was not appointed on a permanent basis in favour of Lee Johnson, though was appointed in the caretaker manager role once again the following year after Johnson left to manage Bristol City. During the latter spell, he guided Barnsley to a 3–2 win against Oxford United in the Football League Trophy final and promotion to the Championship by beating Millwall 3–1 in the League One play-off final. His success as caretaker, leading Barnsley to their first cup final victory since 1912 and promotion to the Championship, led to his being appointed head coach on a permanent basis.

The good form and results continued for the first half of the 2016–17 Championship season, as the club ended 2016 in ninth position. Heckingbottom was awarded Sports Hero of the Year by The Yorkshire Post. Heckingbottom signed a new rolling contract at Barnsley on 2 February 2018, but he left the club days later to take a similar position with Leeds United.

Leeds United 
On 6 February 2018, Heckingbottom was announced as the new head coach of Leeds United on an 18-month contract. In his first match as head coach, Leeds lost 2–1 to Sheffield United, and finished 13th in the 2017–18 EFL Championship league table. Heckingbottom blooded youngster Bailey Peacock-Farrell as first-choice goalkeeper and also gave debuts to academy players Tom Pearce, Paudie O'Connor, Hugo Díaz and Ryan Edmondson. Heckingbottom integrated further academy players with the first team during a controversial post-season tour of Myanmar. Heckingbottom was sacked by Leeds on 1 June 2018, after just four months with the club, and was succeeded by Marcelo Bielsa.

Hibernian
Heckingbottom was appointed head coach of Scottish Premiership club Hibernian on 13 February 2019. The club went on an unbeaten league run, and Heckingbottom won the Premiership Manager of the Month award for March 2019. Two days later, Heckingbottom won his first Edinburgh derby match as Hibs manager against Hearts at Tynecastle. Hibs finished in fifth position, but Heckingbottom was unhappy that the team "downed tools" in the last few matches of the season.

Hibs won only one of their first eleven league matches in the 2019–20 season. Heckingbottom was sacked on 4 November following a 5–2 defeat by Celtic in a League Cup semi-final, with the team sitting in 10th place in the league.

Sheffield United
Heckingbottom was appointed as under-23s lead coach at Sheffield United in July 2020. After first-team manager Chris Wilder left the club by mutual consent in March 2021, with the team bottom of the Premier League and 12 points adrift of safety, Heckingbottom took interim charge until the end of the season. United lost 5–0 to Leicester City in his first match in charge, and relegation to the Championship was confirmed after four more defeats. Sheffield United won three of their last six matches, and Heckingbottom was reportedly shortlisted for the permanent position, but former Fulham manager Slaviša Jokanović was appointed instead, with Heckingbottom returning to his previous role as the under-23s manager at the club.

On 25 November 2021, Heckingbottom was appointed manager of Sheffield United, this time on a permanent basis, on a four-and-a-half year deal following the sacking of Jokanović. In his first game in charge, the Blades beat Bristol City 2–0. The team ended the season in fifth place, subsequently qualifying for the promotion playoffs, though they lost to Nottingham Forest in the semi-finals.

An impressive start to the 2022–23 season saw Heckingbottom awarded the EFL Championship Manager of the Month award for August 2022 after picking up 14 points from seven matches. Three wins from three away matches saw Heckingbottom claim the award for a second consecutive month.

Career statistics

Managerial record

Honours

Player
Sheffield Wednesday
Football League One play-offs: 2004–05

Barnsley
Football League One play-offs: 2005–06

Manager
Barnsley
Football League One play-offs: 2015–16
Football League Trophy: 2015–16

Individual
EFL Championship Manager of the Month: August 2022, September 2022
League One Manager of the Month: March 2016

References

External links

1977 births
Living people
Footballers from Barnsley
English footballers
Association football defenders
Manchester United F.C. players
Sunderland A.F.C. players
Scarborough F.C. players
Hartlepool United F.C. players
Darlington F.C. players
Norwich City F.C. players
Bradford City A.F.C. players
Sheffield Wednesday F.C. players
Barnsley F.C. players
Mansfield Town F.C. players
Gateshead F.C. players
English Football League players
National League (English football) players
Harrogate Town A.F.C. players
English football managers
Barnsley F.C. managers
Leeds United F.C. managers
English Football League managers
Hibernian F.C. managers
Scottish Professional Football League managers
Sheffield United F.C. managers
Premier League managers